Grewia retinervis (Afrikaans: basterskurweblaarrosyntjie, roughly translated "Baster curved-leaf grape") is a plant native to Namibia and South Africa. It is found in the North West and Limpopo provinces and is listed as "safe" (LC) by the SANBI Red List.

References

retinervis
Plants described in 1910
Taxa named by Max Burret